The WWWF/WWF Junior Heavyweight Championship is a former championship recognized by the World (Wide) Wrestling Federation and New Japan Pro-Wrestling for wrestlers of smaller size. The title existed from 1967 through 1985.

History

In April 1994, the WWWF championship belt was used as a trophy for the first ever Super J-Cup, which was won by Wild Pegasus.

Reigns

See also
IWGP Junior Heavyweight Championship
NWA World Junior Heavyweight Championship
NWA International Junior Heavyweight Championship
WWF Light Heavyweight Championship
WWE Cruiserweight Championship

Footnotes

References

Wrestling Information Archive

External links
WWF Junior Heavyweight Title

WWE championships
New Japan Pro-Wrestling championships
Junior heavyweight wrestling championships